East Elementary School can refer to several schools in the United States.
 East Elementary at J. A. Rogers in Kansas City, Missouri
 East Elementary School in Littleton, Colorado
 East Elementary School in Mountain Home, Idaho
 East Elementary School in Portland, Indiana
 East Elementary School in Taft, Texas